In mathematics and physics, the plate trick, also known as  Dirac's string trick,  the belt trick, or the Balinese cup trick, is any of several demonstrations of the idea that rotating an object with strings attached to it by 360 degrees does not return the system to its original state, while a second rotation of 360 degrees, a total rotation of 720 degrees, does. Mathematically, it is a demonstration of the theorem that SU(2) (which double-covers SO(3)) is simply connected. To say that SU(2) double-covers SO(3) essentially means that the unit quaternions represent the group of rotations twice over. A detailed, intuitive, yet semi-formal articulation can be found in the article on tangloids.

Demonstrations
Resting a small plate flat on the palm, it is possible to perform two rotations of one's hand while keeping the plate upright. After the first rotation of the hand, the arm will be twisted, but after the second rotation it will end in the original position. To do this, the hand makes one rotation passing over the elbow, twisting the arm, and then another rotation passing under the elbow untwists it.

In mathematical physics, the trick illustrates the quaternionic mathematics behind the spin of spinors. As with the plate trick, these particles' spins return to their original state only after two full rotations, not after one.

The belt trick

The same phenomenon can be demonstrated using a leather belt with an ordinary frame buckle, whose prong serves as a pointer. The end opposite the buckle is clamped so it cannot move. The belt is extended without a twist and the buckle is kept horizontal while being turned clockwise one complete turn (360°), as evidenced by watching the prong. The belt will then appear twisted, and no maneuvering of the buckle that keeps it horizontal and pointed in the same direction can undo the twist. Obviously a 360° turn counterclockwise would undo the twist. The surprise element of the trick is that a second 360° turn in the clockwise direction, while apparently making the belt even more twisted, does allow the belt to be returned to its untwisted state by maneuvering the buckle under the clamped end while always keeping the buckle horizontal and pointed in the same direction.

Mathematically, the belt serves as a record, as one moves along it, of how the buckle was transformed from its original position, with the belt untwisted, to its final rotated position. The clamped end always represents the null rotation. The trick demonstrates that a path in rotation space (SO(3)) that produces a 360 degree rotation is not homotopy equivalent to a null rotation, but a path that produces a double rotation (720°) is null equivalent.

Belt trick has been witnessed in 1-d Classical Heisenberg model as a breather solution.

See also
Anti-twister mechanism
Spin–statistics theorem
Orientation entanglement
Tangloids

References

External links
Animation of the Dirac belt trick, including the path through SU(2)
Animation of the Dirac belt trick, with a double belt
Animation of the extended Dirac belt trick, showing that spin 1/2 particles are fermions: they can be untangled after switching particle positions twice, but not once
Mechanical linkage implementing the belt trick
Air on the Dirac Strings, showing the belt trick with several belts attached to a spherical particle, by Louis Kauffman and colleagues
Video of Balinese cup trick
The Dirac String Trick
The double-tipping nullhomotopy

Rotation in three dimensions
Spinors
Topology of Lie groups
Science demonstrations